The 2018 Acrobatic Gymnastics World Championships was the 26th edition of acrobatic gymnastics competition and took place in Lotto Arena, Antwerp, Belgium from April 13 to April 15, 2018.

Medal summary

Medal table

Results

References

Acrobatic Gymnastics World Championships
International gymnastics competitions hosted by Belgium
Sports competitions in Antwerp
Acrobatic Gymnastics World Championships
Acrobatic Gymnastics World Championships
Acrobatic Gymnastics World Championships